The Hi-Fives are an American rock band from the San Francisco Bay Area.

History
The band was formed in 1994 after drummer Al Sobrante (John Kiffmeyer) left the previous incarnations, The Ne'er Do Wells and Thee Shatners. Sobrante was replaced by drummer Julie Rose, formerly of Red No.9. Julie remained with the band through the recording of the first Lookout! Records album Welcome To My Mind. The title track was a minor hit on college radio and modern rock stations.

Julie left the band for personal reasons and was replaced by Evan Mendell from Benicia. The band was asked to open for Green Day during the 1994 Dookie tour, along with Pansy Division. Evan left the band after the tour and was replaced by Danny Seelig from The Phantom Surfers.

The band won a category in the 1996 Bay Area Music Awards ("Bammies") for "Outstanding Alternative Pop/Rock Group" and embarked on a tour in the United States and Japan with the Mr. T Experience. While on  U.S. tour with The Queers, Jess and Danny both quit the band onstage after a fight. They returned to record the second album And A Whole Lotta You, but both were soon replaced with Steve Faine, previously of Decal and The Stimmies; and Gary Gutfeld of Redemption 87.

The 1998 album Get Down followed. John Denery married Judy (from Judy and the Loadies), moved to Hawaii and back, while Chris Imlay became a graphic designer for such magazines as Gearhead, MacAddict, PlayStation: The Official Magazine, and Wired. The band played a couple of shows in 2005, and a show in January 2008 supporting the Mr. T Experience.

Members
Chris Imlay—Guitar and Vocals
John Denery—Guitar and vocals
Jess Hilliard—Bass guitar
Julie Rose—Drums
Evan Mendell—Drums
Steve Faine—Bass Guitar
Gary Gutfeld—Drums

Discography

Studio albums
 Welcome to My Mind (Lookout! Records, 1995)
 And a Whole Lotta You! (Lookout! Records, 1997)
 Get Down!  (Lookout! Records, 1998)

Singles and EPs
 It's Up To You (Lookout! Records)
 Summer Games (Lookout! Records)
 Hypnotizer (G.I. Records)
 Misery (Go Zombie Records)

References

External links
Old Thumb Records Hi-Fives page
Lookout! Records page
SPIN: 20 Essential Songs From the Late Lookout! Records
Meet The Hi-Fives
Thee Shatners on a Planet Pimp Records tribute page
The Hi-Fives get caught in a Green Day mosh

Indie rock musical groups from California
Musical groups established in 1994
Musical groups from the San Francisco Bay Area
1994 establishments in California